This is a list of cricket grounds in the West Indies that have been used for first-class, List A and Twenty20 cricket matches.

Structure of cricket in the West Indies
The West Indies Cricket Board and the West Indies cricket team are made up of representatives from 15 mainly English-speaking countries in the Caribbean, which are:

Test grounds

ODI Grounds

Grounds listed by Country

 Grounds that have hosted international matches are listed in bold.

Anguilla

Antigua and Barbuda

Barbados

British Virgin Islands

Dominica

Grenada

Guyana

Jamaica

Montserrat

Saint Kitts and Nevis

Saint Lucia

Saint Vincent and the Grenadines

Sint Maarten

Trinidad & Tobago

United States Virgin Islands

See also
List of Test cricket grounds
Cricket in the West Indies
West Indies cricket team

References

External links
Cricket grounds in West Indies - CricketArchive.

Grounds
West Indies